Ingmar Weber is a German computer scientist known for his research on Computational Social Science in which he uses online data to study population behavior. He was the Research Director for Social Computing at the Qatar Computing Research Institute, and is a Professor at Saarland University. He serves as editor-in-chief for EPJ Data Science. Previously, he served as editor-in-chief for the International Conference on Web and Social Media. Weber is also an ACM Distinguished Member, as well as an ACM Distinguished Speaker. Weber's research has been widely covered in the media.

He has been awarded an Alexander von Humboldt Professorship in AI.

Research 
Weber currently works with international agencies on developing new methodologies for monitoring international migration and digital gender gaps.

Migration 
While at Yahoo! Research, Weber pioneered the use of geo-located email login data to study migration and mobility patterns.
He has since also analyzed data from Twitter and Google Plus for similar studies.

He now works with experts at the European Commission's Joint Research Centre and International Organization for Migration to use Facebook's advertising audience estimates to obtain timely insights into migration flows.

Digital Gender Gaps 
He works with the United Nations Foundation's Data2X initiative to study digital gender gaps, in particular internet access gender gaps.
With support by the Data2X initiative he helped create a website for real-time monitoring of different types of digital gender gaps.

References 

Living people
1978 births
German computer scientists